The Citizens Banking Company, at 112-116 N. Main St. in Baxley in Appling County, Georgia, was built in 1911.  It was listed on the National Register of Historic Places in 1985.

Its first floor includes a section which was originally a bank, with an oblique corner entrance, and also separate commercial space.  The original bank was closed and sold at auction in 1917;  two other banks subsequently used the bank space.

It was deemed "significant in architecture as a fine example of a building built to be a bank and commercial structure during the early 20th-century
Neoclassical era" including that it "exemplifies the strong, secured look that bankers sought in their turn-of-the-century buildings, obviously to stress the strength
of their institution" and that it "is also a good and relatively early use of poured reinforced concrete construction in a small Georgia town."  It was deemed "significant in commerce as a good example of the development of a small-town pre-Depression banking and commercial institution in the early 20th century."

References

External links
 

Bank buildings on the National Register of Historic Places in Georgia (U.S. state)
Buildings and structures completed in 1912
Buildings and structures in Appling County, Georgia
National Register of Historic Places in Appling County, Georgia

External links